Bulgakov is a rural locality (a khutor) in Pokrovskoye Rural Settlement, Leninsky District, Volgograd Oblast, Russia. The population was 28 as of 2010. There is 1 street.

Geography 
Bulgakov is located on Caspian Depression, on the left bank of the Volga River, 21 km northeast of Leninsk (the district's administrative centre) by road. Kovylny is the nearest rural locality.

References 

Rural localities in Leninsky District, Volgograd Oblast